St. Aloysius Roman Catholic Church is a historic church at 202 Mt. Mercy Drive in Peewee Valley, Kentucky.  It was built in 1914 and added to the National Register in 1989.

It is a small Late Gothic Revival-style church.  To its northeast is a historic rectory which has been so altered that it was deemed non-contributing, and a non-contributing 1950s school building associated with the church.

It is built of limestone.  It has corner towers and a "boldly crenelated front vestibule".

References

Roman Catholic churches completed in 1914
20th-century Roman Catholic church buildings in the United States
Roman Catholic churches in Kentucky
Churches on the National Register of Historic Places in Kentucky
Gothic Revival church buildings in Kentucky
National Register of Historic Places in Oldham County, Kentucky
Churches in Pewee Valley, Kentucky
1914 establishments in Kentucky